The Museum of Korean Buddhist Art is a Buddhism museum in Wonseo-dong, Jongno-gu, Seoul, South Korea.

See also
Korean Buddhist art
List of museums in South Korea

External links

Art museums and galleries in Seoul
Buddhism in Seoul
Jongno District
Buddhist museums
Religious museums in South Korea
Religious buildings and structures completed in 1993